Eugene Stephen Rhodes (September 2, 1927 – March 10, 2018) was an American basketball player and coach.

Career
Rhodes played college basketball at Western Kentucky University.  While Rhodes was a player, WKU won the Ohio Valley Conference championship in 1949, 1950 and 1951, playing in the National Invitational Tournament in each of those seasons.

Rhodes played in the NBA for the Indianapolis Olympians.

Rhodes was later head basketball coach at St. Xavier High School, leading that team to the 1958 Kentucky state championship.

In 1964, Rhodes later returned to WKU as an assistant coach under John Oldham, to 1968.  In that time the team went to two NCAA tournaments and appeared once in the National Invitational Tournament.

During the inaugural season of the American Basketball Association the Kentucky Colonels started out with a record of 5-12, which led to the firing of head coach John Givens. Rhodes replaced Givens and guided the Colonels to fourth place in the Eastern Division. The Colonels lost the 1968 Eastern Division semifinals to the Minnesota Muskies 3 games to two.

In the 1968–69 season Rhodes led the Colonels to a record of 42-36 which was good for third place in the Eastern Division. Rhodes also coached the East team in the ABA All Star game. The Colonels made history this season as Penny Early became the first female player in the history of professional basketball. In the playoffs, the Colonels lost a close series, 4 games to 3, to the Indiana Pacers.

During the 1969–70 season the Colonels posted a record of 45 wins and 39 losses, claiming second place in the Eastern Division. The Colonels beat the New York Nets 4 games to 3 in the Eastern Division semifinals bust lost the Eastern Division finals to the Indiana Pacers, 4 games to 1.

Rhodes began the 1970–71 season with a 10–5 record with the Colonels but was fired at that point. Alex Groza was briefly the Colonels' head coach for two games (winning both) and Frank Ramsey assumed the reins for the remainder of the season as the Colonels defeated the Miami Floridians 4 games to 2 in the Eastern Division semifinals, defeated the Virginia Squires 4 games to 2 in the Eastern Division finals but then lost a very close ABA Championship series, 4 games to 3, to the Utah Stars.

In 1973, Rhodes became general manager of the Kentucky Colonels.

Death
Rhodes died on March 10, 2018, aged 90 in his hometown in Louisville, Kentucky.

References

External links
 Basketball Reference.com page
 Remember the ABA.com

1927 births
2018 deaths
American men's basketball coaches
American men's basketball players
Basketball coaches from Kentucky
Basketball players from Louisville, Kentucky
Indianapolis Olympians draft picks
Indianapolis Olympians players
Kentucky Colonels coaches
Kentucky Colonels executives
Louisville Male High School alumni
Point guards
Sportspeople from Louisville, Kentucky
Western Kentucky Hilltoppers baseball coaches
Western Kentucky Hilltoppers basketball coaches
Western Kentucky Hilltoppers basketball players